Joseph F. Bellante Jr. (December 6, 1932 – April 28, 2011) was an American educator and politician.

Biography
Bellante was born on December 6, 1932, in Villa San Giovanni, Italy. He traveled to America by ship when he was only 6 years of age for his family to seek a better life. He graduated from Lincoln High School in Milwaukee, Wisconsin before graduating from the University of Wisconsin– Milwaukee. During the Korean War, he served in the United States Army. Bellante was an elementary school teacher. In 1967, Bellante served in the Wisconsin State Assembly and was a Republican from Milwaukee, Wisconsin. From 1980 to 1996, Bellante served on the Norway, Wisconsin Town Board. Then from 1996 until his death in 2011, Bellante served on the Racine County, Wisconsin Board of Supervisors. Bellante died suddenly on April 28, 2011, Leaving behind his son Joe Bellante III and his grandson Joseph Bellante IV

References

1932 births
2011 deaths
People from Reggio Calabria
Italian emigrants to the United States
Educators from Wisconsin
Politicians from Milwaukee
People from Norway, Wisconsin
County supervisors in Wisconsin
Wisconsin city council members
Republican Party members of the Wisconsin State Assembly
Military personnel from Wisconsin
United States Army personnel of the Korean War
University of Wisconsin–Milwaukee alumni
United States Army soldiers
American people of Italian descent